Unsane, Insane and Mentally Deranged is the debut album by Murder Squad. It was released in 2001.

Track listing

Credits
 Matti Kärki - vocals
 Richard Cabeza - bass
 Uffe Cederlund - guitars
 Peter Stjärnvind - drums

Murder Squad albums
2001 debut albums